NMB may stand for:
Namibia, ITU country code
National Mediation Board, an independent agency of the U.S. government
The Neal Morse Band, stylized as NMB since 2021
Nelson Mandela Bay Metropolitan Municipality, a metropolitan municipality in Eastern Cape, South Africa
Neuromedin B, a peptide in mammals
New methylene blue, an organic staining agent
NMB Technologies, a subsidiary of MinebeaMitsumi
North Miami Beach, Florida, a city in the U.S.
Daman Airport, Daman and Diu, India, IATA airport code NMB
NMB (Tanzania), a bank
NMB Bank Nepal
NMB Bank Limited, Zimbabwe
Big Nambas language, ISO 639 code nmb

See also

NMB48, a Japanese music group